Cattanach is a Scottish surname. It may refer to:

George Cattanach (1878–1954), Canadian lacrosse player
Helen Cattanach (1920–1994), Scottish nurse
John Cattanach (1863–1926), American baseball player
John Cattanach (shinty) (1885–1915), Scottish shinty player
Lachlan Cattanach Maclean, 11th Chief (1465–1523), Scottish clan chief
Robert Cattanach (born 1984), Australian footballer

See also
Clan Chattan, a Scottish clan
Cattanach v Melchior, an Australian court case